Goodyear Dunlop Tires Operations, S. A. v. Brown, 564 U.S. 915 (2011), was a United States Supreme Court case in which the Court held that the connection between Goodyear and its subsidiaries with the state of North Carolina was not strong enough to establish general personal jurisdiction over the companies.

Fact and Procedural History 
Two 13-year-old boys from North Carolina died as a result of a bus accident outside of Paris. The parents of the boys believed the accident was due to a defective tire manufactured by a foreign subsidiary of Goodyear Tire and Rubber Company and sued for damages in a North Carolina state court. The foreign subsidiaries asserted that the North Carolina courts lacked jurisdiction over them and moved to dismiss. The North Carolina trial court denied the motion and the North Carolina Court of Appeals affirmed.

Opinion 
As the claim did not arise in the forum state of North Carolina and none of the type of tires that caused the accident made it to North Carolina, the court cannot exercise specific jurisdiction over the defendants. Additionally, as only a small proportion of the subsidiaries’ products were distributed in North Carolina, and the subsidiaries did not systematically or persistently conduct business there as to be essentially at home there, the court cannot exercise general jurisdiction over all claims against the defendant.

Result 
The Supreme Court reversed, holding that the foreign subsidiaries lacked a significant connection to North Carolina to warrant general personal jurisdiction.

References

External links
 

2011 in United States case law
Goodyear Tire and Rubber Company
United States personal jurisdiction case law
United States Supreme Court cases
United States Supreme Court cases of the Roberts Court